Trifolium nanum, the dwarf clover, is a perennial plant from the family Fabaceae. It was first recorded by Edwin James in 1820.  Nanum means, "dwarf," in Latin.

Description 
Trifolium nanum is a perennial plant small species of clover growing in the Rocky Mountains. Often found at more than 11,000 feet, it is able to survive extreme conditions such as blizzards and extreme cold. Dwarf clover grows in dense mats to survive in its environment of dry, nutrient poor, rocky terrain. Flowers are pink and pea-shaped, blooming June through August.

References

nanum